"Candy Girl" is the title of a hit single recorded in 1963 by the Four Seasons.  Written by Larry Santos, it is the first original Four Seasons single composed by neither Bob Gaudio nor Bob Crewe. The writer, Larry Santos, would become a chart artist in his own right with 1976's "We Can't Hide It Anymore".  A stereo version was released in 1975, on The Four Seasons Story album.

The B-side, "Marlena", was a Top 40 hit in its own right: it reached No. 36 on the Hot 100. It was written by Gaudio.

Background
The song tackles the subject of a girlfriend with whom the singer's "love is real". The Four Seasons song is a rock ballad to a loving girlfriend ("I've been a-searching o’er this big wide world/Now, finally, I found my/Candy Girl").

Chart performance 
"Candy Girl" reached No. 3 on the Billboard Hot 100 singles chart and No. 13 on the R&B chart, the last of the group's entries to make the R&B chart.

References

External links
 Full lyrics of this song  at OldieLyrics 

1963 singles
The Four Seasons (band) songs
Vee-Jay Records singles
Song recordings produced by Bob Crewe
1963 songs